Femina is an Indonesian weekly women's magazine founded in 1972. The magazine is owned by Femina Group.

History and content
Femina was established in 1972 and the first issue was published in September 1972. The cover of the first issue was shot in the garage of Svida Alisjahbana, whose father was the magazine's photographer. The magazine is published on a weekly basis. One of its editors was Mirta Kartohadiprodjo, Alisjahbana's aunt, and Irma Hardisurya was fashion editor. Widarti Gunawan, publisher and later chief editor, had done an apprenticeship with Verenigde Nederlandse Uitgeverijen, the Dutch publisher of the women's magazine Margriet; along with Libelle, Margriet was one of Feminas magazine's models.

Svida Alisjahbana is the chief executive of Indonesia's Femina Group.

Cover 
Lists Of Actress and Models Appeared on Femina Cover
 Annisa Pohan (17-23 April 2003, 14-20 July 2005, 22-28 February 2007, 28 August-3 September 2010)
 Dian Sastrowardoyo (3-9 August 2000, 21-27 February 2002, 12-18 September 2002, 24-30 April 2003, 24-30 November 2005, 23-29 November 2006, 31 January-6 February 2008, 20-26 November 2008, 31 October-6 November 2009, 31 July-6 August 2010, 21-27 July 2012, 9-15 May 2015, August 2018)
 Bunga Citra Lestari (15-21 November 2007, 19 September-2 October 2009, 31 March-6 April 2012, 27 June-3 July 2015, 17-23 February 2017)
 Desy Ratnasari (6-12 May 1993, 3-9 March 1994, 29 January-11 February 1998, 27 May-2 June 1999, 23-29 December 1999, 6-12 April 2000, 5-11 February 2004, 3-16 November 2005, 12-18 April 2007)
 Sophia Latjuba (29 March-4 April 1990, 2-8 December 1993, 1-7 June 1995, 21-27 December 1995, 25 June-1 July 1998, 13-19 September 2001, 18-24 July 2002, 2-8 January 2003, 3-9 June 2004)
 Marsha Timothy (12-18 July 2007, 30 January-5 February 2010, 17-23 December 2011, 24-30 May 2012, 9-15 November 2013, June 2017, March 2019)
 Ruth Sahanaya (19-25 December 1996, 22-28 April 2004)
 Agnez Mo (4-10 January 2007, 11-17 April 2009, 1-7 January 2011, 2012 Yearly Edition)
 Andien (21-27 August 2010, 29 September-5 October 2012, 21-27 April 2017)
 Carissa Putri (3-9 July 2008, 28 March-3 April 2009, 12-18 March 2011, 25 February-2 March 2012, 13-19 September 2014)
 Adinia Wirasti (3-9 December 2011, 1-7 March 2014, 7-13 November 2015, May 2019)
 Prisia Nasution (14-20 April 2012, 7-13 February 2015, October 2019)
 Elvira Devinamira (3-9 May 2014, 21-27 March 2015)
 Wanda Hamidah (4-10 January 1996, 15-21 July 1999, 17-23 May 2001, 12-18 May 2005)
 Sandra Dewi (1-7 May 2008, 22-28 January 2009, 8-14 August 2009, 9-15 February 2013, 17-23 December 2016, April 2019)
 Vina Panduwinata (20 December 1983, 22 January 1987)
 Camelia Malik (21 June 1983, 13 August 1985)
 La Rose (22 April 1986)
 Elma Theana (4-10 April 1996, 28 August-3 September 1997, 8-14 July 2004)
 Fahrani (27 June-3 July 2002, 27 March-2 April 2003, 24-30 May 2007, 2008 Yearly Edition, 4-10 April 2009)
 Ristanti Aquarini (4-10 July 1996)
 Inneke Koesherawati (22-28 May 1997, 16-22 July 1998)
 Sherina Munaf (2-8 October 2010, April 2018)
 Ratu Felisha (4-10 October 2001)
 Dhini Aminarti (13-19 March 2008)
 Nadia Saphira (8-14 January 2009, 13-19 November 2010)
 Bella Saphira (25 November-1 December 1993, 14-20 September 1995, 5-11 June 1997, 16-22 December 1999, 26 February-3 March 2004, 15-21 December 2005)
 Novita Angie (1-7 March 2007)
 Anita Hara (10-16 August 2006)
 Yuanita Christiani (14-20 November 2009)
 Mieke Amalia (14-20 March 1996, 13-19 August 1998, 8-14 December 2005)
 Paramitha Rusady
 Vira Yuniar (12-18 August 1999, June 2004)
 Rieke Diah Pitaloka (18-24 August 2005)
 Cut Mini Theo (1-7 July 1993, 16-22 March 1995)
 Luna Maya (15-21 May 2003, 9-15 December 2004, 28 June-4 July 2007, 26 June-2 July 2008, 2-8 May 2009)
 Audy Item (12-18 June 2010)
 Farah Quinn (7-13 November 2009)
 Nirina Zubir (30 August-5 September 2014)
 Firrina Sinatrya (31 December 2011-6 January 2012, 19-25 November 2016)
 Titi Sjuman (2009 Yearly Edition, 12-18 September 2009, 3-9 April 2010, 23-29 April 2011)
 Ida Iasha (23 September 1986, 19 March 1987, 23 July 1987, 17-23 November 1994, 2-8 May 1996)
 Donna Harun (29 August-4 September 1991, 18-24 November 1993, 14-20 December 1995, 25-31 January 1996, 9-15 May 2002)
 Maudy Koesnaedi (21-27 September 1995, 18-24 January 1996, 8-14 August 1996, 4-10 June 1998, 9-15 September 1999, 19-25 April 2001, 5-11 August 2004, 7-13 December 2006, 15-21 June 2013)
 Cornelia Agatha (25-31 July 1996, 29 July-4 August 1999, 30 March-5 April 2006)
 Yuni Shara (18-24 March 1999, 30 December 1999-5 January 2000, 2-8 March 2006)
 Diana Pungky (8-14 January 1998, 9-15 September 2004, 29 December 2005-4 January 2006, 31 May-6 June 2007)
 Ayu Azhari (9 April 1987, 5-11 January 1989, 11-17 January 1990, 2-8 March 2000)
 Rossa (11-17 May 2006, 25-31 December 2008, 16-22 January 2010)
 Wulan Guritno (6-12 May 1999, 17-23 January 2002, 22-28 July 2004, 8-14 June 2006, 10-16 May 2007)
 Acha Septriasa (17-23 October 2009, 27 August-2 September 2011, 12-18 January 2013, 17-23 May 2014, 27 February-4 March 2016, 27 August-2 September 2016)
 Feby Febiola (22-28 April 1999, 27 December 2001-2 January 2002, 24-30 July 2003, 27 July-2 August 2006)
 Indah Kalalo (15-21 April 1999, 29 June-5 July 2000, 5-11 April 2001, 8-14 May 2003, 19-25 November 2011)
 Paula Verhoeven (14-20 March 2009, 26 March-1 April 2011)
 Shanty (22-28 March 2001, 20-26 March 2003, 6-12 October 2005, 8-14 February 2007, 26 June-2 July 2010, 1-7 September 2012)
 Krisdayanti (24-30 March 1994, 25 April-1 May 1996, 2002 Yearly Edition, 16-22 May 2002, 11-17 December 2003, 19-25 April 2007, 17-23 April 2008)
 Cut Tari (6-12 August 1998, 13-19 April 2000, 3-9 January 2002, 25-31 July 2002, 15-21 January 2004, 27 November-3 December 2008)
 Tamara Geraldine (1-7 October 1998)
 Titi Kamal (23-29 May 2002, 15-21 July 2004, 15-21 June 2006, March 2020)
 Tamara Bleszynski (May 1996, 9-15 November 2000, 19-25 July 2001, 30 December 2004-5 January 2005, 1-7 December 2005)
 Sarah Sechan (14-20 November 1996, 19-25 June 1997, 17-23 December 1998, 30 November-6 December 2000)
 Mayangsari (13-19 July 2000, 23-29 January 2003)
 Eunike Fedora Sinulingga (14-20 November 2002)
 Isyana Sarasvati (30 July-5 August 2016)
 Lulu Tobing (2-8 April 1997, 28 January-3 February 1999, 8-14 August 2002)
 Ladya Cheryl (24-30 August 2000, 8-14 March 2001, 1-7 August 2002, 10-16 July 2008)
 Jana Parengkuan (2-8 April 1998, 16-22 November 2000, 2-8 August 2001)
 Marisa Lungo (12-18 April 2001, 21-27 June 2001, 2-8 May 2002)
 Ruth Sahanaya (19-25 December 1996, 22-28 April 2004)
 Susan Bachtiar (5-11 May 1994, 9-15 November 1995, 9-15 January 1997, 20-26 April 2000)
 Alisia Rininta (8-14 June 2013)
 Olivia Jensen (12-18 December 2015)
 Marshanda (21-27 February 2009)
 Puput Novel
 Btari Karlinda
 Sarah Azhari (24 April-1 May 1997, 10-16 June 1999)
 Marini Zumarnis (6-12 December 2001)
 Brianna Simorangkir (5-11 November 2016)
 Tya Ariestya (2-8 May 2015)
 Cathy Sharon (21-27 April 2005, 7-13 June 2007, 28 February-6 March 2009, 2-8 July 2011, 10-16 May 2014, 5-11 March 2016, September-October 2020)
 Julie Estelle (11-17 December 2008, 24-30 July 2010, 30 June-6 July 2012, 12-18 April 2014, 31 March-6 April 2017, March 2018)
 Larasati Gading (3-9 July 1997, 27 November-3 December 1997,  7-13 March 2002)
 Titi DJ (9 December 1986, 30 January 1988, 7-13 October 1999, 27 September-3 October 2001, 16-22 January 2003, 19-25 January 2006)
 Maudy Ayunda (12-18 September 2015, 23-29 July 2016)
 Sigi Wimala (21-27 August 2003, 3-9 March 2005, 15-21 March 2007, 14-20 August 2008, 21-27 May 2011, 28 July-3 August 2012, 22-28 November 2014, December 2020-January 2021)
 Revalina S. Temat (20-26 March 2008, 21-27 March 2009, 14-20 August 2010, 29 October-4 November 2011, 17-23 November 2012)
 Tia Ivanka (7-13 November 2002)
 Della Puspita (21-27 November 2002)
 Karenina Anderson (31 July-6 August 1997, 28 April-3 May 2000, 5-11 July 2001, 27 September-3 October 2007)
 Sutra Kharmelia (Ex-news anchor Global TV, 19-25 June 2003)
 Gita Gutawa (26 March-1 April 2016)
 Chilla Kiana (12-18 November 2016)
 Reza Artamevia (30 July-5 August 1998, 17-23 November 2005)
 Raisa (6-12 September 2014, 26 November-2 December 2016)
 Nasya Marcella (2-8 April 2016)
 Indah Permatasari (16-22 April 2016)
 Naila Alatas (6-12 January 2000)
 Dhea Ananda (22-28 May 2008)
 Olla Ramlan (28 March-3 April 2002)
 Asmirandah (1-7 August 2009)
 Jihan Fahira (2-8 July 1998, 12-18 November 1998, 9-15 March 2000, 13-19 March 2003, 13-19 May 2004)
 Aimee Juliette (4-10 February 1999, 4-10 July 2002)
 Ersa Mayori (4-10 March 1999, 5-12 March 2008, 15-21 August 2009, 1-7 May 2010)
 Anindya Kusuma Putri (15-21 August 2015)
 Ananda Lontoh (18-24 May 2000)
 Wiwied Muljana (May 1998, 18-24 April 2002)
 Endhita (23-29 April 1998, 9-15 January 2003)
 Chelsea Islan (29 March-4 April 2014, 6-12 June 2015)
 Ira Wibowo (1-7 June 2000)
 Caroline Zachrie (12-18 June 1997, 25-31 March 1999, 5-11 August 1999, 6-12 July 2000, 2001 Yearly Edition, 26 June-2 July 2003)
 Astrid Ellena (24-30 December 2011)
 Claudia Hidayat (15-21 November 2001)
 Femmy Permatasari (20-26 January 2000)
 Febby Lawrence (16-22 March 2000, 8-14 June 2000)
 Tika Bravani (27 July-2 August 2013, 14-20 March 2015, 19-25 May 2017)
 Ria Irawan (10-16 April 1997, 30 March-5 April 2000)
 Maia Estianty (9-15 October 2003, 5-11 April 2007)
 Atiqah Hasiholan (1-7 January 2009, 19-25 June 2010, 6-12 April 2013)
 Dewi Rezer (8-14 March 2007, 11-17 July 2009)
 Anggun C. Sasmi (23-29 November 2000, 2004 Yearly Edition, 18-24 May 2006, 28 December 2006-3 January 2007, 31 January-6 February 2009, 4-10 May 2013)
 Mariana Renata (2-8 December 1999, 21 December 2000-3 January 2001, 12-18 July 2001, 2-8 December 2004, 18-24 January 2007, 23-29 January 2010, 29 May-4 June 2010)
 Shirley Margaretha (18-24 January 2001, 30 November-6 December 2001)
 Egidia Savitri (3-9 July 2003)
 Imelda Therinne (30 January-5 February 2003, 23-29 August 2007, 3-16 August 2013)
 Cut Keke (8-14 July 1999)
 Maria Agnes (26 April-2 May 2001, 27 February-5 March 2003)
 Fifi Aleyda Yahya (4-10 May 2000)
 Jill Gladys (6-12 July 2013)
 Zivanna Letisha (13-19 July 2013)
 Whulandary Herman (13-19 March 2010, 3-9 November 2012, 28 December 2013-3 January 2014)
 Gracia Indri (30 May-5 June 2015)
 Dinna Olivia (2-8 September 1999, 1-7 March 2001, 22-28 May 2003, 20-26 January 2005, 2007 Yearly Edition)
 Desy Chang (7-13 February 2002)
 Ikke Nurjannah (9-15 July 1998)
 Nikita Willy (16-22 November 2013)
 Marcella Zalianty (20-26 February 2003, 6-12 January 2005, 10-16 April 2008, 25-31 December 2010)
 Dominique Diyose (18-24 April 2009, 26 February-4 March 2011, 14-20 February 2015, January 2019)
 Rachel Maryam (6-12 February 2003, 10-16 March 2005, 21-27 June 2007, 17-23 July 2010)
 Davina Veronica (18-24 December 1997, 9-15 December 1999, 14-20 June 2001, 30 May-5 June 2002, 7-13 August 2008)
 Sari Nila (26 October-1 November 2000, 31 March-6 April 2005)
 Velove Vexia (22-28 September 2012, 11-17 October 2014, 5-11 September 2015)
 Marissa Nasution (15-21 January 2009, 3-9 July 2010, 25 June-1 July 2011)
 Lula Kamal (4-10 August 2005)
 Raline Shah (19-25 March 2011, 18-24 August 2012, 20-26 April 2013, 10-16 February 2017, November 2017)
 Renata Kusmanto (9-15 August 2014, 13-19 June 2015, September 2017)
 Juwita Rahmawati (28 May-3 June 2016)
 Izabel Jahja (31 January-6 February 2002)
 Tracy Trinita (1-7 January 1998, 24-30 December 1998, 2-8 November 2000, 13-26 December 2001, 10-16 April 2003, 30 September-6 October 2004, 20-26 December 2007)
 Tara Basro (27 September-3 October 2014, 13-19 February 2016)
 Yasmine Wildblood (16-22 June 2012)
 Asmara Abigail (29 October-4 November 2016, January 2020)
 Siti Nurhaliza (24-30 June 2004, 12-18 October 2006)
 Inul Daratista (29 May-5 June 2003)
 Alena (27 June-3 July 2009, 27 October-2 November 2012)
 Senk Lotta (25-31 July 2009)
 Lenna Tan (12-18 December 2009)
 Raihaanun (16-22 October 2010)
 Kimmy Jayanti (4-10 December 2010, 2010 Yearly Edition)
 Tasya Farasya (June 2019)
 Rinni Wulandari (4-10 June 2016)
 Arzetti Bilbina (21-27 August 1997, 15-21 January 1998, 25-31 May 2000, 2003 Yearly Edition, March 2004)
 Sere Kalina Florencia Sitorus (11-17 June 2016)
 Yuki Kato (18-24 June 2016)
 Michelle Ziudith (6-12 August 2016)
 Sheryl Sheinafia (17-23 March 2017)
 Dewi Sandra (11-17 September 2003, 25 November-1 December 2004, 23-29 March 2006, 6-12 September 2007, 20-26 June 2009, 8-14 October 2011, 14-20 July 2012)
 Karina Salim (11-17 April 2015)
 Alexandra Asmasoebrata (8-14 August 2015)
 Tatjana Saphira (31 May-6 June 2014, 25-31 July 2015, November 2018)
 Mesty Ariotedjo (21-27 June 2014)
 Rianti Cartwright (1-7 June 2006, 24-30 July 2008, 5-11 March 2011, 3-9 October 2015, 24-30 March 2017)
 Natalie Margareth (4-10 November 1999, 15-21 June 2000, 1-7 November 2001, 19-25 December 2002, 21-27 February 2008)
 Kelly Tandiono (1-7 June 2013, 19-25 April 2014, 23-29 April 2016)
 Putri Marino (December 2017, February 2020, April-July 2022)
 Kamidia Radisti (9-15 July 2011, 5-11 April 2014, 24-30 October 2015)
 Selma Abidin (22-28 November 2001, 12-18 June 2003)
 Ayushita (6-12 August 2011, 7-13 June 2014, 5-11 December 2015)
 Aryani Fitriana (2-8 July 2016)
 Pevita Pearce (10-16 September 2011, 23-29 March 2013, 21-27 November 2015, 16-22 July 2016)
 Andini Effendi (8-14 February 2001, 28 May-3 June 2011, 4-10 October 2014, April 2020)
 Maria Harfanti (30 January-5 February 2016)
 Nadia Mulya (23-29 August 2001, 7-13 August 2003)
 Vanesha Prescilla (June 2018)
 Karina Nadila (7-13 May 2016)
 Alessandra Usman (12-18 March 2016)
 Ayu Gani (25 April-1 May 2015, 3-9 September 2016, July 2018)
 Kirana Larasati (11-24 July 2015)
 Jessica Mila (3-9 March 2017)
 Patricia Gouw (29 January-4 February 2011, 27 April-3 May 2013, 28 November-4 December 2014, 26 September-2 October 2015, 25 June-1 July 2016, March-June 2021)
 Yura Yunita (October 2018)
 Diana Loo (December 2018)
 Renatta Moeloek (July 2019)
 Laura Basuki (4-10 July 2009, 16-22 May 2015, August 2019)
 Nadya Hutagalung (25-31 December 1997, 10-16 January 2002, 4-10 September 2003, 28 September-4 October 2006, 18-24 December 2010)
 Ayu Nisa Nurfitri (23-29 January 2016)
 Tiffany Zhu (7-13 January 2017)
 Evanny Wityo (7-13 April 2017)
 Ayla Dimitri (November 2019)
 Mikha Tambayong (28 June-4 July 2014, August-October 2021)
 Arawinda Kirana (December 2021-March 2022)
 Ariel Tatum (January-April 2023)

Special Cover
 Dede Yusuf & Desy Ratnasari (1994 Yearly Edition)
 Marissa Haque, Soraya Haque & Shahnaz Haque (20-26 January 1994)
 Karenina Anderson & Ari Wibowo (1999 Yearly Edition)
 Reza Artamevia & Adjie Massaid (11-17 February 1999)
 Anjasmara & Dian Nitami (1-7 July 1999)
 Marcellino Lefrandt & Audrey Herawati (16-22 September 1999)
 Maudy Koesnaedi & Ari Sihasale (17-23 February 2000)
 AB Three (27 July-2 August 2000)
 Dinna Olivia & Mariana Renata (14-20 September 2000)
 Atalarik Syah, Bella Saphira, Primus Yustisio & Ronny Sianturi (28 September-4 Oktober 2000)
 Ferry Salim & Lola Amaria (15-21 February 2001)
 Karenina Anderson & Bertrand Antolin (6-12 September 2001)
 Sigi Wimala & Irwan Chandra (14-20 February 2002)
 Davina Veronica, Indah Kalalo, Desi Mulasari, Maria Agnes (28 February-6 March 2002)
 Olga Lidya, Enditha & Ira Duaty (25 April-1 May 2002)
 Dewi Lestari & Marcell (13-19 February 2003)
 Dinna Olivia, Marcella Zalianty & Mariana Renata (12-18 February 2004)
 Maia Estianty & Ahmad Dhani (17-23 February 2005)
 Krisdayanti, Agnez Mo & Ruth Sahanaya (22-28 September 2005)
 Ayu Azhari, Sarah Azhari & Rahma Azhari (5-11 January 2006)
 Nia Dinata, Djenar Maesa Ayu & Nadine (6-12 April 2006)
 Lula Kamal, Sonia Wibisono & Angelique Wijaya (27 April-3 May 2006)
 Tamara Bleszynski & Luna Maya (3-9 August 2006)
 Nova Eliza, Victoria Margaretha & Tracy Trinita (14-20 December 2006)
 Titi Kamal & Christian Sugiono (15-21 February 2007, 2015 Yearly Edition)
 Marcella Zalianty, Darius Sinathrya, Winky Wiryawan, Nicholas Saputra & Tora Sudiro (22-28 March 2007)
 Sarah Sechan, Susan Bachtiar & Rachel Maryam (17-23 January 2008)
 Surya Saputra & Chintya Lamusu (14-20 February 2008)
 Terry Puteri & Fiantika Ambadar (27 March-2 April 2008)
 Rahma Landy, Francine Roosenda, Duma Riris, Joice Triatman (3-9 April 2008)
 Marsha Timothy & Fachry Albar (14-20 February 2009)
 Dion Wiyoko, Teuku Wisnu, Vino G Bastian & Cathy Sharon (13-19 February 2010)
 Imelda Therinne & Shareefa Daanish (10-16 April 2010)
 Yuni Shara & Krisdayanti (5-11 June 2010)
 Rahma Landy & Shahnaz Mariela (10-16 July 2010)
 Laudya Chintya Bella & Chicco Jerikho (12-18 February 2011)
 Shireen Sungkar & Teuku Wisnu (11-17 February 2012)
 Patricia Gouw & Aldila Wisusena (2-8 June 2012)
 Alfoncius & Rianti Cartwright (13-19 October 2012)
 Whulandary Herman, Christian Sugiono, Joe Taslim & Ashraf Sinclair (16-22 March 2013)
 Putri Miranti & Rinrin Marinka (28 March-3 April 2015)
 Cathy Sharon & Julie Estelle (18-24 April 2015)
 Ririn Ekawati & Rini Yulianti (20-26 June 2015)
 Haslinda & Cut Nuremelia (28 November-4 December 2015)
 Salma Mochtar, Salwa Mochtar & Nadine Waworuntu (26 December 2015-1 January 2016)
 Putri Dina Maharita, Fitrah Islami & Patricia Ranieta (20-26 February 2016)
 Elvira Devinamira, Anindya Kusuma Putri & Whulandary Herman (9-15 April 2016)
 Nicholas Saputra, Sissy Priscillia, Titi Kamal, Dian Sastrowardoyo & Adinia Wirasti (29 April-6 May 2016)
 Chelsea Islan, Bunga Citra Lestari & Tara Basro (13-19 August 2016)
 Jennie Zhang, Shareefa Daanish & Nagita Slavina (17-23 September 2016)
 Widika Sidmore & Tatyana Akman (24-30 December 2016)
 Ashraf Sinclair, Mike Lewis & Vino G. Bastian (5-11 May 2017)
 Raisa & Isyana Sarasvati (12-18 May 2017)
 Whulandary Herman & Artika Sari Devi (August 2017)
 Kelly Tandiono, Laura Muljadi & Paula Verhoeven (May 2018)
 Maudy Ayunda, Ririn Ekawati, Najwa Shihab, Raline Shah (September 2018)
 Happy Salma, Tjok Gus Dwi Santana Kerthyasa, Tjokorda Sri Kinandari Kerthyasa & Tjokorda Ngurah Rayidaru Kerthyasa (September 2019)
 Rory Asyari, Richard Kyle & Morgan Oey (December 2019)
 Stay at Home during COVID-19 pandemic (May 2020)

List of editors-in-chief
Mitra Kartohadiprodjo (1972–1982)
Widarti Gunawan (1982–1999)
Dewi Dewo (1999–2002)
Petty S Fatimah (2002–present)

References

External links
 Femina-Online - Indonesia
 Jakarta Post article 

1972 establishments in Indonesia
Magazines published in Indonesia
Magazines established in 1972
Weekly magazines
Women's magazines
History of women in Indonesia